Stratis Mastrokyriakos (Greek: Στρατής Μαστροκυριάκος, born 24 August 1967) is a  professional soccer manager - Football coach and former Greek football player, and one of the first Greeks to become a UEFA Pro Licence holder. He was a player for Panegialios FC and the Egio Athletic Association FC.

Education
From 1987 to 1991, Mastrokyriakos studied at the University of Applied Sciences, Karpenisi, & the University of Applied Sciences Messologi. He also received several football diplomas: the Hellenic Football Federation Licence (1997), the UEFA B Licence (2000), the UEFA A Licence (2003), the UEFA Pro Licence (2006) and Director of Coaching Diploma - United Soccer Coaches (2018).

Professional head coach career
 2012–present time, NY Pancyprian FC  
 2010–2011, P.G. Panegialios FC
 2007–2010, A.P.S. Zavlani FC
 2005–2006, A.P.S. Zavlani FC 
 2004–2005, P.G.Panegialios FC
 2001–2004, Achaea Football Clubs Association 
 1995–2001, A.E. Egio FC

Honours
National Amateur Cup Eastern New York State Soccer Association Champion 2020
 Cosmopolitan Soccer League Champion 2019  
 Amateur Cup Eastern New York State Soccer Association Champion 2019
Eastern New York State Soccer Association Champion 2019
Paraglia Cup Eastern New York State Soccer Association Champion 2019    
UEFA Regions' Cup Greece Champions 2004

References

External links
 https://www.thenationalherald.com/250034/double-champions-ny-pancyprian-freedoms-celebration-on-june-18/
 https://www.anamniseis.net/i-omada-tou-pagkypriou-anadeixtike-kypellouxos-sto-super-cup-rapaglia-cup/
 https://www.thenationalherald.com/250034/double-champions-ny-pancyprian-freedoms-celebration-on-june-18/
 https://docs.google.com/spreadsheets/d/1tfWZNmz54-5gQdGGDBPqraecwCK5ET2Kr3ybfNtK1x0/htmlview

1967 births
Living people
Association footballers not categorized by position
Panegialios F.C. players
Expatriate soccer managers in the United States
Greek football managers
Greek footballers
Greek expatriate football managers
Greek expatriate sportspeople in the United States